A Mother's Secret (French: Le Secret d'une mère) is a 1952 French drama film directed by Jean Gourguet and starring André Le Gall, Blanchette Brunoy and Grégoire Aslan.

Synopsis
After his wife dies in a car accident, her husband comes to believe that their young daughter is not really his child.

Cast
 André Le Gall as Paul Martin 
 Blanchette Brunoy as Françoise Gaudry 
 Grégoire Aslan as Georges Lavier 
 Jane Marken as Rosa 
 Jean Clarieux as Lucien Gaudry 
 Robert Hommet as Le docteur Dumont
 Zizi Saint-Clair as Josette Martin 
 René Génin as Le père aux chiens 
 Jacques Bernier
 Georges Bever
 Monique Gérard
 Héléna Manson
 Mireille Ozy
 Marcel Pérès
 Michel Vadet

References

Bibliography 
 Rège, Philippe. Encyclopedia of French Film Directors, Volume 1. Scarecrow Press, 2009.

External links 
 

1952 films
1952 drama films
French drama films
1950s French-language films
Films directed by Jean Gourguet
French black-and-white films
1950s French films